Orrin Frink Jr. (31 May 1901 – 4 March 1988) was an American mathematician who introduced Frink ideals in 1954.

Frink earned a doctorate from Columbia University in 1926 or 1927 and worked on the faculty of Pennsylvania State University for 41 years, 11 of them as department chair. His time at Penn State was interrupted by service as assistant chief engineer at the Special Projects Laboratory at Wright-Patterson Air Force Base during World War II, and by two Fulbright fellowships to Dublin, Ireland in the 1960s.

Aline Huke Frink, his wife, was also a mathematician at Penn State. Their son, also named Orrin Frink, became a professor of Slavic languages at Ohio University and Iowa State University.

Selected publications

See also
Petersen's theorem

References

Further reading
Who Was Who in America: with World Notables, by Marquis Who's Who, Inc., Volume 9, 1989.

External links

1901 births
1988 deaths
20th-century American mathematicians
Columbia University alumni
Pennsylvania State University faculty
Scientists from New York City
People from Kennebunkport, Maine
Mathematicians from New York (state)